Under the Whyte notation for the classification of steam locomotives by wheel arrangement,  is a locomotive with one pair of unpowered leading wheels, followed by two sets of three pairs of powered driving wheels and no trailing wheels. The wheel arrangement was principally used on Mallet-type articulated locomotives. Some tank locomotive examples were also built, for which various suffixes to indicate the type of tank would be added to the wheel arrangement, for example  for an engine with side-tanks.

Overview
The 2-6-6-0 wheel arrangement was most often used for articulated compound steam Mallet locomotives. In a compound Mallet, the rear set of coupled wheels are driven by the smaller high pressure cylinders, from which spent steam is then fed to the larger low pressure cylinders that drive the front set of coupled wheels.

Usage

New Zealand

The sole NZR E class locomotive of 1906 was the only 2-6-6-0T locomotive ever built for and used by the New Zealand Railways Department. It was built at the Petone Workshops in Wellington and was designed for use on the world famous Rimutaka Incline. Numbered 66, making it E 66, it spent the first part of its working life in the Wellington region hauling trains up and down the Rimutaka Incline. It was eventually transferred to the Wellington-Johnsonville section for banking duties, even though it was not designed for that type of work. In 1917, E 66 was withdrawn from service and scrapped. It did not survive long enough for preservation.

South Africa
The South African Railways (SAR) operated 57 Mallet locomotives with this wheel arrangement, spread over six classes, all of them .
 In 1909, the Natal Government Railways (NGR) placed a single experimental 2-6-6-0 Mallet articulated compound steam locomotive in service. Built by the American Locomotive Company (ALCO), this was the first Mallet type compound steam locomotive to enter service in South Africa. The locomotive had Walschaerts valve gear, a bar frame and used saturated steam. At the time it was the most powerful locomotive in the country. In 1912, when it was assimilated into the SAR, it was designated Class MA.

 In 1910, following on the satisfactory performance of the experimental Mallet, the NGR placed five more in service, also built by ALCO. These five differed little from the previous Mallet, basically only in respect of larger boilers which made them slightly heavier and tenders with a larger coal capacity. In 1912, when they were assimilated into the SAR, they were designated Class MB.
 In 1912, the SAR placed ten Class MC Mallets in service. Built by the North British Locomotive Company (NBL), these also had Walschaerts valve gear and used saturated steam. Their Type TM tenders were the same as those of the SAR's Class 3 4-8-2, but they differed little from the previous Mallets in size, power and performance. Two of them were equipped with superheaters at a later date, but no others were modified in this manner.

 In 1914, the SAR placed fifteen Class MC1 Mallets in service. Ordered from NBL in 1913, they were an improved version of the Class MC with a redesigned boiler which included a superheater, and with  larger diameter low pressure and high pressure cylinders. The result was a much better performing locomotive with an increased tractive effort.
 Between 1914 and 1921, the SAR placed eighteen Class MJ Mallets in branchline service. Designed by D.A. Hendrie, Chief Mechanical Engineer (CME) of the SAR from 1910 to 1922, they were superheated and had Walschaerts valve gear and Belpaire fireboxes. Ten were ordered from Maffei but, as a result of the outbreak of the First World War, only two could be delivered from Germany in 1914. The order for the remaining eight was then transferred to NBL, who delivered them in 1917. After the cessation of hostilities, Maffei requested that the already built balance of the original order also be accepted. These eight locomotives were delivered in 1921.

 In 1918, the SAR placed eight Class MJ1 Mallets in branchline service. Because of the disruption of British and German locomotive builders during the First World War, they were ordered from Montreal Locomotive Works (MLW) in Canada. The locomotive design was by MLW, based on the specifications for the Class MJ Mallet. Like the Class MJ, they were superheated, with Walschaerts valve gear and Belpaire fireboxes, but with slightly larger boilers and with the sandbox mounted on the boiler in North American style. The Class MJ1 was the last Mallet type to be placed in service by the SAR and all its subsequent new articulated locomotives were to be Garratts and Modified Fairlies.

United States

At least two American railroads used 2-6-6-0 Mallet locomotives. One was the Denver, Northwestern and Pacific Railway, which later became the Denver and Salt Lake Railroad and eventually the Denver and Salt Lake Railway. Towards the end of their service life, after the acquisition of the Denver and Salt Lake, these locomotives were used by the Denver and Rio Grande Western Railroad (D&RGW). The locomotives were initially used across the Rollins Pass and later on the Moffat Tunnel route of the Denver and Salt Lake. None were preserved; they were all scrapped by the D&RGW between 1948 and 1952.

Another was the Virginian Railway, whose Class AA 2-6-6-0 is depicted.

References